Ambrose Morris (1885 – death date unknown) was an American Negro league second baseman between 1909 and 1914.

A native of Indiana, Morris made his Negro leagues debut in 1909 with the Indianapolis ABCs. He played three seasons with Indianapolis through 1911, and played for the Schenectady Mohawk Giants in 1914.

References

External links
 and Seamheads

Date of birth missing
Year of death missing
Place of birth missing
Place of death missing
Indianapolis ABCs players
Schenectady Mohawk Giants players
Baseball second basemen
Baseball players from Indiana
1885 births